Dave Cook is a comic writer, video game writer and author living in Edinburgh, Scotland. He has previously worked as a video game journalist and PR consultant  In 2014, he founded independent comic production house Card Shark Comics

Under Card Shark Comics, Cook wrote and published post-apocalyptic comic series Bust, dark fantasy series Vessels and the six-part serial Feather for UK anthology Comichaus

In 2016, Cook released the first book in the cyberpunk comic series Killtopia through publisher BHP Comics, which in 2018 won a Creative Edinburgh Award for Creativity.

In 2021, Cook and BHP Comics sold the TV adaptation rights for Killtopia to Los Angeles animation studio Voltaku Studios

In 2019, Cook began work on writing the video game Unbound: Worlds Apart with independent developer Alien Pixel Studios. The game launched on July 28, 2021 for Steam and Nintendo Switch.

In 2021, Cook announced he was writing the for rogue-like video game Loot River with independent developer Straka Studio.

In 2021, Cook self-published the non-fiction guide book, Crowdfunding Comics: A Guide to Marketing, Running and Fulfilling a Comic Book Kickstarter.

In 2021, gaming book publisher Bitmap Books announced it would be publishing Cook's coffee table book Go Straight: The Ultimate Guide to Side-Scrolling Beat 'Em Ups in February 2022.

He has written game reviews and features for online and print publications, including Vice and BuzzFeed. His previous work includes writing for GamesTM, The Escapist, as well as SquareGo, Ready Up, The List and The Skinny.

From January 2009 to April 2010, Cook was managing director of video game public relations firm Ink Media. He wrote a weekly gaming column in The Scotsman which has earned him a Games Media Award in 2008, 2010 and one in 2011 for best regional newspaper writer.

Between April 2010 and July 2012, Cook served as games editor at UK-based multiformat gaming site NowGamer. He wrote for video game website VG247 as Deputy Editor.

In October 2012, Dave Cook received criticism by video games writer Rab Florence and video game journalist John Walker for participating in a competition to win a PS3 by tweeting about a specific company's game.

On Boxing Day 2013, Cook and author Matthew Drury released collaboratively-written sci-fi novel Drifting.

References

External links
 Dave Cook's author page at NowGamer
 Collection of Dave Cook's articles for SquareGo
 Collection of Dave Cook's articles for The Scotsman

Writers from Edinburgh
Video game critics
1983 births
British public relations people
Living people
Scottish comics writers